The Steve "Boomer" Hawrysh Award is an ice hockey trophy that is presented annually to the Most Valuable Player of the Manitoba Junior Hockey League (MJHL) during the regular season.

Steve “Boomer” Hawrysh reached a milestone in 1992 with 60 consecutive years in total hockey involvement in Dauphin. As a player, Hawrysh was on three Manitoba  championship winners with the Dauphin intermediates. He began coaching in 1952 in Dauphin, Manitoba.  Steve Hawrysh was one of the original architects of the new Manitoba Junior Hockey League.

MJHL Most Valuable Players

References 
Manitoba Junior Hockey League
Manitoba Hockey Hall of Fame
Hockey Hall of Fame
Winnipeg Free Press Archives
Brandon Sun Archives

Manitoba Junior Hockey League trophies and awards